The 2013–14 North American winter was one of the most significant for the United States, due in part to the breakdown of the polar vortex in November 2013, which allowed very cold air to travel down into the United States, leading to an extended period of very cold temperatures. The pattern continued mostly uninterrupted throughout the winter and numerous significant winter storms affected the Eastern United States, with the most notable one being a powerful winter storm that dumped ice and snow in the Southeastern United States and the Northeastern United States in mid-February. Most of the cold weather abated by the end of March, though a few winter storms did affect the Western United States towards the end of the winter.

While there is no well-agreed-upon date used to indicate the start of winter in the Northern Hemisphere, there are two definitions of winter which may be used. Based on the astronomical definition, winter begins at the winter solstice, which in 2013 occurred on December 21, and ends at the March equinox, which in 2014 occurred on March 20. Based on the meteorological definition, the first day of winter is December 1 and the last day February 28. Both definitions involve a period of approximately three months, with some variability.



Seasonal forecasts 

On November 21, 2013, the National Oceanic and Atmospheric Administration's Climate Prediction Center issued its U.S. Winter Outlook. Sea surface temperatures had been near average since spring 2012, and forecasters expected these conditions to continue through winter 2013–14, with neither El Niño nor La Niña conditions expected to affect the season's climate. In the outlook, little rainfall was anticipated in the Southwestern United States, and the development of drought was expected in the Southeastern United States. Below-average levels of precipitation and below-average temperatures were expected in the Alaskan panhandle. Below-average temperatures were also favored in the Northern Plains, while above-average temperatures were favored in New England, the South-Central, Southeastern, and Southwestern United States, and western Alaska. The remainder of the country fell into the outlook's "equal chance" category, with an equal chance of above-average, below-average, and near-average temperatures and/or precipitation.

Events

October storm complex 

The first winter storm of the season, a significant system, was forecast by the National Weather Service, which issued a Blizzard Warning on October 3 preceding the storm. The storm occurred as an early season blizzard, and, according to the Weather Prediction Center, was an event of a magnitude unseen for the past decade.

Late November storm complex 
Around Thanksgiving, there was a winter storm that was responsible for at least 14 deaths in 5 states.

The Weather Channel meteorologist Jonathan Erdman described the storm as "about as expansive a winter storm as it get," On November 24, 2013, 300 flights were cancelled at Dallas/Fort Worth International Airport. Flagstaff, Arizona recorded 11 inches of snow, and near the Four Corners as much as 4 feet fell. As much as a foot of snow fell in Colorado and Utah, and 13 people had died as of November 25. The serious winter storm that was expected did not materialize. As of November 27, 2013, 475 flights had been cancelled, with 3,600 delays, many in the New York City and Philadelphia areas. Snow turned to rain in Pittsburgh despite an ominous forecast, but 9 inches fell in Mercer County, Pennsylvania, and 4.5 inches in Buffalo. Atlanta had less than an inch of snow, but it was the third November snow since 1930. Morehead City, North Carolina had serious damage, and damage was also reported in Atlantic Beach, North Carolina, from an EF2 tornado.

December cold wave 
On December 1, 2013, the weakening of the polar vortex led to the beginning of an abnormally cold trend in the Eastern and Central United States. On December 6, the continued deterioration of the polar vortex led to the jet stream pushing southward, bringing record cold temperatures across the Eastern U.S. During the cold wave, which extended from December 6–10, over 150 daily precipitation records and close to 100 daily snowfall records were broken across the northeastern, southeastern and south central United States. Eugene, Oregon had their second snowiest December day on record. Several cities had 3+ days of record lows. On December 4, the record low on December 4 in Denver of  broke the record by 8°F (4°C). Numerous airline flights were canceled and there were reports of power outages. The cold blast led to a monthly average temperature of only  in Rhinelander, Wisconsin, the 8th coldest December for the state on record.

Early December winter storm 
On December 2, a Pacific storm system entered the Western United States, and it spread heavy rain and snow from the Pacific coast to the Rocky Mountains. As the storm continued to move east, high snow totals fell in its wake. Maximum reported snowfall totals in this area were found to have occurred in Idaho, Wyoming, and Montana, where  or greater were reported. As reported by the National Weather Service's Weather Prediction Center, the surface low reached its peak strength at approximately 6:00 UTC on December 3 while it was over western Wyoming, where a central 

Pre-Christmas storm complex 

On December 19, a strong cold front moved southward across much of the Great Plains. As a result of the shallow depth of the front, once the front reached parts of the higher terrain in northwestern Arkansas, the front stalled, leaving areas just ahead of the front significantly colder than areas behind it. While temperatures in much of the Plains remained at or below freezing, an upper low was forming over the Southwestern United States. As the low pushed eastward and northeastward across parts of eastern New Mexico and West Texas, it interacted with moisture over the Southern Plains; there was an unusually high amount of moisture across the area for December, and the low drew much of it over the cold air-mass near the surface. With the moisture in place, light rain began to fall in some locations prior to sunset. The rain persisted and spread from southwest to northeast overnight, with moderate rain beginning to fall across much of Southwest, Central, and northeastern Oklahoma and Southeast Kansas.

Early January blizzard

Early 2014 cold wave 

2014 began on an active note, with a major winter storm affecting much of the United States. Between  of snow fell across a wide area spreading from central Missouri across Illinois and Indiana to Lower Michigan. Snowfall totals of near  were recorded across northern Indiana, and additional accumulations occurred downwind from the major Great Lakes. This storm was accompanied by some of the coldest temperatures to affect the Central and Eastern United States in 20 years. Upper flow which was meridional all the way up to the Arctic Circle provided a direct path for cold air advection to occur southward to the United States. During the event, wind chills dropped as low as the -60s °F (-50s °C) across the Northern High Plains. The event was short-lived, with the portion of the polar vortex that had traveled across the Great Lakes lifting northeastward into Quebec soon after.

Late January blizzard 

As it moved towards the East Coast, it began to intensify and snowfall began to spread from areas like Washington D.C. to Hartford, Connecticut. A surface low formed and began to track northwards, with winds increasing along the coastline, causing blizzard conditions. The storm was also proceeded by more cold temperatures as well.

Late January southern winter storm 

Early on January 27, a cold front crossed into the Gulf of Mexico, with temperatures ahead of the front in Texas and Louisiana in the 60s °F (10s °C) dropping to below freezing only one day later. As this occurred, a southern stream upper-level trough translated in an eastward direction across northern parts of Mexico. This also coincided with the backing of low-level winds along the western Gulf Coast. Relatively warm and humid air overrode the colder air near the surface, resulting in precipitation falling in Texas, Louisiana, and parts of the Southeastern U.S. as a mixture of rain, freezing rain, and snow. Late in the day, a broad northern stream upper-level trough containing a trough axis was located over the Central and Eastern United States, and the storm began to develop as this trough axis, initially reaching from the Upper Midwest to the northern Rocky Mountains, sharpened and moved in a southeastward direction during the following 24-hour period. This activity coincided with the movement of additional cold air at the surface. Many areas experiencing liquid precipitation falling at the surface saw rain switch over to freezing rain by 12:00 UTC January 28 as temperatures dropped. A mixture of frozen to partly frozen precipitation spread eastward over the following period into the early hours of January 29, impacting much of the Deep South. Widespread ice accumulations in excess of  occurred as a result of the event. As the southern stream trough axis weakened while it moved eastward across the western Gulf of Mexico, a northern stream trough amplified as it headed toward the Southeastern U.S. Overrunning wintry precipitation affected the area as a weak surface low traveled along the front and crossed into the Atlantic.

Mid-February nor'easter 

On February 11, a quick-moving area of low pressure moved across the Southeast, bringing rain and snow to areas like Atlanta, interacting with some of the cold air to the north of it. It then quickly moved offshore by roughly 3 p.m. This part of the storm was only the beginning of a crippling 2-day streak of winter nightmares across the South.

Later on February 11, another area of low pressure formed on the extreme southern edge of the Gulf Coast, near the TX–LA border. Drawing moisture from the Gulf of Mexico, it was able to fire up a small area of showers and thunderstorms near the coastline. As it tracked eastward, it began to interact with the cold air above it, producing an area of ice and snow on its backside as it moved to the east. On February 12, the swath of ice exploded in size as the conditions for freezing rain began to come together. Areas from eastern Alabama, including Atlanta in Georgia to the Southeast coast and South Carolina were included in this swath of icy precipitation. Meanwhile, to the south, near the Gulf Coast, heavy showers and thunderstorms were consisted in a streak of rain stretching up to southern parts of Georgia. As the low moved east, it then dissipated as a new area of low pressure developed off the South Carolina coast late on February 12, and that began to strengthen as it tracked to the north, placing the Northeast in the fire zone for the winter storm.

Early on February 13, more snow began to develop on the northern side of the storm as the precipitation shield approached the New York metropolitan area in colder air. At the same time, warmer air was beginning to funnel into the storm system, and as a result the rain/snow line slowly creeped up the state of New Jersey as the warm air began to further intrude into the winter storm. By 10 a.m, most of the precipitation had moved north of New York City, and began to reach into areas like Boston. Even though the area of low pressure, which had now deepened to  late on February 13, was offshore of the East Coast, little to no precipitation was falling as a result of dry air to funnel its way into the storm.

Early March winter storm 

On February 28, an extratropical cyclone moved near California, intensifying as it did so. Showers and thunderstorms began spreading into California early on March 1 which is the atmospheric river with heavy snowfall in the mountains, torrential rainfall, triggering numerous flash floods, and even spawning two EF0 tornadoes in Arizona and California The storm weakened somewhat as it began to pass through the southwestern United States, but maintained its structure as it began to move towards the central part of the country.

At the same time, an Alberta clipper was moving through the Upper Midwest, dropping relatively light to moderate snow through the areas. The energy between the clipper system and the remains of the extratropical cyclone combined to produce energy for a long tracked winter storm. Late on March 2, snow and ice began to develop along a weak area of low pressure near Texas and Oklahoma. Numerous locations reported thunderstorms with sleet and freezing rain due to the intense upper-air dynamics and Arctic air at the surface. A small squall line began to set up ahead of the cold front. Snow and ice began to reach into the Mid-Atlantic near midnight, which eventually started to sag southwards, keeping most of the heaviest snow accumulations to the south of the Northeast. The system then moved off by evening on March 3. At least 16 fatalities were reported.

Late March bomb cyclone 

Late on March 25, a winter storm emerged off the coast of the Southeastern United States and began to undergo explosive intensification, becoming a meteorological bomb by March 26. After making landfall on Nova Scotia, the system weakened to a  nor'easter on March 27, before weakening further to a  storm on March 28. On March 29, the system deteriorated into a weak winter storm over Greenland, where it would remain for the next few days while slowly dissipating.

See also 

 Global storm activity of 2010
 Early 2014 North American cold wave
 November 2014 North American cold wave
 Cold wave
 Polar vortex
 Winter storm

References

External links 
 2013 Storm Summaries from the Weather Prediction Center
 2014 Storm Summaries from the Weather Prediction Center
 Major Winter Weather Events during the 2013-2014 Cold Season (WPC)

 
2013-14
Winter
Winter